Shepherd of Salisbury Plain (1795) is the name of the hero, a shepherd of the name of Saunders, in a tract written by Hannah More, characterised by homely wisdom and simple piety. It was satirised, renamed The Washerwoman of Finchley Common, by William Thackeray in his novel Vanity Fair.

References

Male characters in literature
Fictional shepherds